Sergei Nikolayevich Novitski (born 16 May 1981) is a Russian former competitive ice dancer. He skated with Jana Khokhlova until April 2010. Together, they are the 2008 World bronze medalists, 2009 European champions, and two-time (2008–09) Russian national champions.

Career 
Originally a singles skater, he switched to dance after failing to get his triple jumps. Early in his career he skated with Oksana Goncharenko. He then skated with Natalia Lepetiukha until she retired.

Partnership with Jana Khokhlova 
In October 2001, he teamed up with Jana Khokhlova, coached by Larisa Filina. Three months later, they finished seventh at the Russian Nationals. In 2003, they switched to the husband-and-wife coaching team of Alexander Svinin and Irina Zhuk. Khokhlova / Novitski trained mainly in Moscow's Sokolniki ice rink where ice time was limited, forcing them to move around to other rinks, however, the situation later improved.

In 2006, Khokhlova / Novitski qualified for the Olympics in Turin, Italy, finishing 12th. In autumn of 2006, they won their first Grand Prix series medals and qualified for the Grand Prix Final. They placed 4th at 2007 Europeans and 8th at Worlds. Their breakthrough came during the 2007-08 season. At 2007 Trophée Eric Bompard, Khokhlova / Novitski upset reigning European champions Isabel Delobel / Olivier Schoenfelder to win the free dance, although finishing second overall. They then claimed bronze at the 2008 Europeans. At 2008 Worlds, they were second after the original dance which combined with a fifth place in the free dance saw them finish in third overall and earn them a World medal.

During the 2008-09 season, Khokhlova / Novitski won gold at the European Championships but slipped to 6th at Worlds. The following season, they slipped further in the rankings, dropping to third at 2010 Europeans and 9th at the Olympics. They withdrew from Worlds due to Novitski's injury. He was injured in a car accident in 2006 and never fully healed. Following his competitive retirement, Novitski began coaching in Moscow.

Programs 
(with Khokhlova)

Competitive highlights 

GP: Grand Prix; JGP: Junior Grand Prix

With Khokhlova

With Lepetiukha

With Goncharenko

References

External links 

 
 Official site - Khokhlova / Novitski

1981 births
Russian male ice dancers
Figure skaters from Moscow
Figure skaters at the 2006 Winter Olympics
Figure skaters at the 2010 Winter Olympics
Living people
Olympic figure skaters of Russia
World Figure Skating Championships medalists
European Figure Skating Championships medalists
Universiade medalists in figure skating
Universiade gold medalists for Russia
Medalists at the 2003 Winter Universiade
Competitors at the 2005 Winter Universiade